Athletics events at the 1994 South American Games were held at the Polideportivo Misael Delgado in Valencia, Venezuela.  A total of 43 events were contested, 24 by men and 19 by women. 

Following a controversy between Sabino Hernández, president of the Comité
Olímpico Ecuatoriano and Jacobo Bucaram, president of the Federación
Ecuatoriana de Atletismo in the context of funding the number of athletes to
travel to the games (22 versus 33 athletes), Ecuador did not 
participate in this year's athletics competitions.

On the other hand, athletics heavyweights Brazil (although only with a small delegation) and Colombia competed for the first time, leading to a noticeable improvement of the results as evident from the setting of (about) 26 games records.

Medal summary

Medal winners were published in a book written by Argentinian journalist Ernesto Rodríguez III with support of the Argentine Olympic Committee (Spanish: Comité Olímpico Argentino) under the auspices of the Ministry of Education (Spanish: Ministerio de Educación de la Nación) in collaboration with the Office of Sports (Spanish: Secretaría de Deporte de la Nación).  Eduardo Biscayart supplied the list of winners and their results.  Further results were published elsewhere.

Men

Women

Medal table (unofficial)

References

1994
International athletics competitions hosted by Venezuela
South American Games
1994 South American Games